The Carlock Building, 1001 – 1013 13th Street, Lubbock, Texas, is an office building designed in the Art Deco style by J. B. Davies & Company of Fort Worth, Texas.  It was constructed in 1930 as a cotton exchange for J. D. Doughty and J. B. Kerby. The building reflected the importance of cotton in the region and the growth of peripheral industries.

Cotton merchandising firms headed by Charles Paul Carlock and Watson have continuously occupied this building since its construction.  The Carlock Building has been listed on the National Register of Historic Places.

The building currently houses law offices of Glasheen, Valles and Inderman L.L.P. - Personal Injury Attorneys

See also

National Register of Historic Places listings in Lubbock County, Texas

References

National Register of Historic Places in Lubbock, Texas
Office buildings in Lubbock, Texas
Art Deco architecture in Texas
Commercial buildings on the National Register of Historic Places in Texas
Office buildings completed in 1930